The following television stations operate on virtual channel 48 in the United States:

 K11XU-D in El Centro, California
 K19KP-D in Hermiston, Oregon
 K22NI-D in Leesville, Louisiana
 K26NB-D in Klamath Falls, Oregon
 K28NT-D in Bentonville/Rogers, Arkansas
 K28NU-D in Buffalo, Oklahoma
 K30PZ-D in Litchfield, California
 K34NI-D in Florence, Oregon
 K48AH-D in Willmar, Minnesota
 K48DV-D in Alexandria, Minnesota
 K48GQ-D in Redwood Falls, Minnesota
 K48KJ-D in Geneva, Minnesota
 KAVC-LD in Denver, Colorado
 KDPH-LD in Phoenix, Arizona
 KFBI-LD in Medford, Oregon
 KHHI-LD in Honolulu, Hawaii
 KHVM-LD in Minneapolis, Minnesota
 KKIF-LD in Twin Falls, Idaho
 KLBB-LD in Lubbock, Texas
 KLNK-LD in Groveton, Texas
 KMJF-LD in Columbus, Nebraska
 KNVO in McAllen, Texas
 KOCY-LD in Oklahoma City, Oklahoma
 KPXR-TV in Cedar Rapids, Iowa
 KSTS in San Jose, California
 KTDO in Las Cruces, New Mexico
 KTPN-LD in Tyler, Texas
 KUAN-LD in Poway, California
 KUOC-LD in Enid, Oklahoma
 KVCV-LD in Victoria, Texas
 KVSN-DT in Pueblo, Colorado
 KVTJ-DT in Jonesboro, Arkansas
 KXUN-LD in Sallisaw, Oklahoma
 W13DS-D in Cleveland, Ohio
 W17ED-D in Hornell/Alfred, New York
 W19ET-D in Bath, New York
 W23FN-D in Albany, Georgia
 W26BF-D in Elmira, New York
 W31EL-D in Baton Rouge, Louisiana
 WAFF in Huntsville, Alabama
 WCET in Cincinnati, Ohio
 WCPX-LD in Columbus, Ohio
 WDME-CD in Washington, D.C.
 WECY-LD in Elmira, New York
 WEUX in Chippewa Falls, Wisconsin
 WFBD in Destin, Florida
 WFNY-CD in Gloversville, New York
 WFUN-LD in Miami, Florida
 WGTW-TV in Burlington, New Jersey
 WIYC in Troy, Alabama
 WLEH-LD in St. Louis, Illinois
 WMEU-CD in Chicago, Illinois
 WMNT-CD in Toledo, Ohio
 WMYV in Greensboro, North Carolina
 WNTZ-TV in Natchez, Mississippi
 WQSJ-CD in Quebradillas, Puerto Rico
 WRID-LD in Richmond, Virginia
 WRNN-TV in Kingston, New York
 WVLR in Tazewell, Tennessee
 WVOZ-TV on Ponce, Puerto Rico
 WVTN-LD in Corbin, Kentucky
 WWHB-CD in Stuart, Florida
 WYDC in Corning, New York
 WYDN in Worcester, Massachusetts
 WZRA-CD in Oldsmar, Florida

The following stations, which are no longer licensed, formerly operated on virtual channel 48:
 K16IG-D in Cottage Grove, Oregon
 K23NZ-D in Three Forks, Montana
 K48NU-D in Beaumont, Texas
 KDMK-LD in Lafayette, Louisiana
 WCYA-LD in Midland, Michigan

References

48 virtual TV stations in the United States